Orrvar Dalby (born 15 May 1952) is head of the development department at Norwegian People's Aid.

Dalby is a previous acting director of NPA. He has also worked as Director of International Programmes for Save the Children Norway, spent 10 years as Chief Executive (Rådmann) in Hurum and Lier. He has participated and headed a number of election observation teams in Europe, Africa and Latin-America.

Works
Ingrid Samset, Orrvar Dalby "Rwanda: Presidential and Parliamentary Elections 2003", NORDEM Report 12/2003

References

Living people
1952 births
Norwegian non-fiction writers
Norwegian businesspeople
Place of birth missing (living people)
Date of birth missing (living people)